Sam & Cat is an American teen sitcom that originally aired from June 8, 2013, to July 17, 2014, on Nickelodeon. It is a spin-off of two TV shows iCarly and Victorious, which Dan Schneider also created. It stars Jennette McCurdy as Sam Puckett from iCarly,  and Ariana Grande as Cat Valentine from Victorious. The girls meet by chance during a bizarre adventure and become roommates, then start a babysitting business to earn extra money.

First announced with a pilot order in August 2012, Nickelodeon picked up the pilot to series in November. Production began on a 20-episode order in January 2013. Following high ratings in its initial episodes, Nickelodeon doubled the episode order to 40 in July. In March 2014, Nickelodeon executive told advertisers that the series had been renewed for a second season.

In April 2014, Nickelodeon announced that the series would go on a production hiatus. Following speculation from media outlets, the network confirmed on July 13 that Sam & Cat had been cancelled.

Plot
Ever since Carly Shay moved to Italy with her father, Sam Puckett has been touring the West Coast on her motorcycle and stops in Venice, Los Angeles. She witnesses Cat Valentine being thrown into the back of a garbage truck and rescues her. They become friends and Cat convinces her to become roommates after Cat's cheerful and supportive grandmother Nona moves to a retirement home called Elderly Acres. To make money rather than getting traditional after-school jobs, Sam and Cat develop an after-school babysitting business called "Sam and Cat's Super Rockin' Fun Time Babysitting Service", which leads them into a series of wacky adventures. Besides Nona, other people involved in their lives are Dice, their next door neighbor who is notorious for helping people for money, and Goomer, a dim-witted professional MMA fighter whom Dice manages.

Cast and characters

Main
  Jennette McCurdy as Sam Puckett, a tomboy who is aggressive, loves pranks, and hates working. After her best friend Carly Shay moved to Italy to live with her father, Sam tours the West Coast on her motorcycle until she saves Cat from a garbage truck. She becomes friends with Cat and joins her in the babysitting job they start. She secretly has a heart of gold and a soft spot for Cat, but will threaten violence on anyone who harms her friends. Sam is not afraid of anything and is handy at fighting or bossing her way out of any situation.
 Ariana Grande as Cat Valentine, who is sweet, naive, bubbly, and almost always happy. She has a playful mood, often takes things literally, and faints when she is frightened. She has a short attention span and has bright red hair dyed to resemble her favorite snack, a red velvet cupcake. Cat has been living with her grandmother Nona since her parents went away to visit her brother, who had been sent to a special facility for his "eccentricities". She can be emotional and never takes criticism well. Despite her ditziness, she is actually very smart and empathetic. In the earlier parts of the show, Ariana Grande dyed her hair red when playing Cat Valentine (which she also did when playing the character on Victorious) until it was changed to her wearing a red wig in later episodes.
  Cameron Ocasio as Dice, Sam and Cat's neighbor.

Recurring

 Maree Cheatham as Nona, Cat's cheerful, supportive, and independent grandmother. Fun-loving and young at heart, Nona prefers the company of people her own age. Although she is always around whenever Sam and Cat need her, she has moved out of the apartment she shared with Cat and into Elderly Acres to be nearer to her friends, allowing Sam to move in permanently. She is criticized for not being in touch with the younger generation, and tells stories which fail to interest them.
 Zoran Korach as Goomer, a professional mixed martial artist who trains at Punchy's Gym. He is 27 years old but has the mental ability of someone much younger. He is very dim-witted and easily confused. Despite his childish nature, he is very good at fighting. Dice took over his management after his original manager claimed Goomer was "too stupid to manage".
 Dan Schneider as the voice of Tandy, a red male robot that works at the restaurant "Bots" as a waiter.
 Lisa Lillien as the voice of Bungle, a blue female robot that works at the restaurant "Bots" as a waitress.
 Nick Gore as Randy, a kid who appeared numerous times in the show and is constantly introducing himself. Randy was rumored to appear in one episode, but the creator of the show, Dan Schneider, found him funny so he became a recurring character.
 Ronnie Clark as Herb, a man who appears to be homeless, but he is in fact rich and owns a condo.

Special guest stars 
 Eric Lange as Mr. Sikowitz, Cat's acting teacher at Hollywood Arts, an eccentric aging hippie who doesn't wear shoes for some reason. His teaching methods are often unconventional, such as when he throws a ball at Cat while she is performing, but they are sometimes effective.  He is a recurring character in Victorious and appeared in "#MommaGoomer".
 Penny Marshall and Cindy Williams as Sylvia Burke and Janice Dobbins, the original creators of the puppet show Salmon Cat, a children's show from the 1970s. Marshall and Williams are famous for playing Laverne DeFazio and Shirley Feeney, respectively, on Laverne & Shirley. The characters live in apartment buildings named "Feeney Villas" and "DeFazio Arms".  
 Kel Mitchell as Peezy B, a huge rap star who has turned down Cat's music video audition.
 Abby Wilde.
 Scott Baio as Officer Kelvin, a police officer who arrests Sam and Cat for "stealing money" from an ATM at the Handy Quick when Yokvish catches on to Cat's project.
 Elizabeth Gillies as Jade West, Cat's friend from Hollywood Arts. She is mean, aggressive, violent, and often offends Cat. She befriends Sam when they discover that they have a lot in common.
 Nathan Kress as Freddie Benson, Sam's friend from Seattle and ex-boyfriend. He likes technology, and served as technical producer of the web show on iCarly. Cat brings him to her house in order to flirt with him at the time when Sam was hanging out with Jade.
 Matt Bennett as Robbie Shapiro, Cat's friend and love interest. He is a nerd who carries a puppet named Rex (who he makes speak as a ventriloquist). He kissed Cat in the last few episodes of Victorious. When Cat hits on Freddie out of jealousy of Sam's friendship with Jade, Robbie is brought in by Jade so that Sam can hit on him.
 Michael Eric Reid as himself, he plays Sinjin Van Cleef in Victorious. Michael appears in "#BlooperEpisode" and tells Zoran Korach that he knows what it's like to be left out for not being a main character.
 Danielle Morrow as Nora Dershlit, an old enemy of Carly, Sam, and Freddie. In "#SuperPsycho," her pet chicken Maurice helps Nora escape from the prison somewhere near Seattle so that she can exact her revenge.
 Reed Alexander as Nevel Papperman, an old enemy of Carly, Sam, and Freddie. In "#SuperPsycho," Nevel is seen in a Peter Sinai hospital for the very sick upon contracting Porcupox (a disease which somehow comes from a porcupine). Sam and Cat visit him in order to get advice on how to find Nora Dershlit.
 Noah Munck as Gibby Gibson, a friend of Carly, Sam, and Freddie. After he is visited by Nora during his date with a girl at a movie theater, Gibby tips off Sam that Nora has escaped from prison.
 Jessica Chaffin as Coco Wexler, a character from Zoey 101 whom Sam and Cat meet at the airport. Coco was once married to Carl, then they divorced. Coco is devastated when Carl proposes to her mother.
 Josh Server as Agent Partridge, an airport agent who interrogates Dice and Goomer after they are mistaken for a terrorist plot.

Guest stars
 River Alexander as Dilben, a rude, annoying and obnoxious boy who claims his father is the landlord of the apartment building, and threatens to kick the girls out of their apartment unless they get rid of a goat they are looking after. He only appears in the episode "#NewGoat". He has an obsession for wearing capes, and each one of his appearances in the episode usually end with Sam pulling his trousers around his head, putting his shirt around his legs, and stealing his cape. At the end of the episode, it turns out Dilben's father isn't landlord of the apartment building, but instead sells "wide shoes to wide-footed women", which Dilben finds embarrassing.
 Griffin Kane and Emily Skinner as Max and Chloe, a brother and sister who, alongside their baby brother Darby, were among the less rambunctious kids babysit on Nona; Sam and Cat babysit them now. They appear in episodes "#Pilot","#NewGoat", and "#PeezyB".
 Sophia Grace Brownlee and Rosie McClelland as Gwen and Ruby, British cousins whom Sam and Cat babysit in the episode "#TheBritBrats". At first they seem polite, but later they behave quite rudely. They are experienced con artists who cheat Dice out of $500 and Cat out of her bicycle. In a loose parody of The Sting, Sam concocts a rigged bingo game to trick the British brats into surrendering Dice's money and Cat's bike. They also were in "#RevengeOfTheBritBrats" where they return and tried to destroy Sam & Cat's friendship. This plan failed when Sam and Cat caught onto their plans.
 Cyrus Arnold as BJ Malloy, a boy who loves to eat eggs and call Dice "Diceberg", because it rhymes with "iceberg" and this attitude stresses Dice. He considers Dice as his friend.
 Steve Lewis as Brody, a spear fisherman that always boasts his job and is often seen with a speargun in his hand.
 Ryan P. Shrime as Yokvish, a clerk at the Handy Quick who enjoys taking selfies and grooming himself. He appeared in "#MagicATM" and "#BlueDogSoda"

Episodes

 The first season was originally planned to have 20 episodes, but on July 11, 2013, Nickelodeon doubled the order to 40. However, only 36 were produced, and 35 were aired (two produced episodes were merged into a single special for airing).

Production

Development
In August 2012, Nickelodeon announced that Dan Schneider, the creator of iCarly and Victorious, would be making a spin-off of both shows called Sam & Cat, starring Jennette McCurdy and Ariana Grande as their respective characters starting a babysitting service together, and ordered the pilot episode. The series was then picked up for 20 episodes in November, with the premiere planned for 2013. In her 2022 memoir I'm Glad My Mom Died, McCurdy revealed that when she entered a development deal to star in the series months earlier, in 2012, the show was planned as Just Puckett, a series following Sam as a school counselor. After she was already attached, the show was redeveloped as a joint spin-off with Grande.

Production began in January 2013, and on June 8, 2013, Sam & Cat premiered in the United States. Several weeks later, on July 11, Nickelodeon doubled the season one order of 20 episodes, to 40. Filming was scheduled to resume in early September 2013 to finish the second half of the first season.

Schneider originally aimed for a March 23, 2013, premiere of Sam & Cat, following the Kids' Choice Awards; however, Nickelodeon intended for the show to make its debut in the fall. On April 18, 2013, the show's two stars Jennette McCurdy and Ariana Grande, via Twitter, announced its premiere was set for June.

Controversy and cancellation
At the Nickelodeon upfront meeting with advertisers on March 13, 2014, Nickelodeon programming president Russell Hicks stated that Sam & Cat had been renewed for a second season, and Adweek reported that an additional 20 episodes were ordered. However, other Nickelodeon sources stated that an official decision was yet to be made on whether the show would be renewed.

In March 2014, McCurdy became the subject of scandal after the leak of photographs revealing McCurdy in various states of undress. The same month, she pulled out of the 2014 Kids' Choice Awards, where Sam & Cat won "Favorite Show" and Grande won "Favorite Actress". McCurdy claimed that her sole purpose of not attending was "unfair treatment" by Nickelodeon.

On April 2, Deadline Hollywood reported that behind-the scenes issues had derailed the network's plan for a second season. In addition, it was reported that both actresses felt "constricted" and were ready to move on from the network. While Nickelodeon attributed the hiatus to the large episode order, Deadline provided an update the following day that the crew had been let go. While Deadline reported that McCurdy and Grande were getting along fine, other outlets began reporting that Nickelodeon had paid Grande more than McCurdy, which was denied by Grande.

In July 2014, Nickelodeon released a promo stating two episodes remained to air. On July 13, Nickelodeon announced that they would not be producing any more episodes of Sam & Cat;  only 36 episodes of the 40-episode order had been produced. Media outlets attributed the cancellation to several factors: a salary dispute between McCurdy and Nickelodeon; an alleged feud between McCurdy and Grande; the leak of racy photographs of McCurdy; the rising music career of Grande; and both actresses' desires to move on to other projects. The final episode aired four days later, as a lead-in to the inaugural Kids' Choice Sports ceremony.

For months in between, rumors of a feud between Grande and McCurdy ran high, and continued to after the series' cancellation. McCurdy stated in a 2015 interview with E! Online: 

In her 2022 memoir I'm Glad My Mom Died, McCurdy claimed she became jealous of Grande – whose role was inserted to a show McCurdy was meant to be headlining herself – because Nickelodeon allowed Grande to pursue other opportunities, while she was denied such. In particular she cites the episode "#StuckInABox", which she claims was shot without Grande due to her music commitments. McCurdy also claims that she was to direct an episode, which went unrealized because a senior crew member threatened to quit if she did. McCurdy claimed the hiatus and cancellation came unexpectedly, as production was shut down due to a sexual harassment claim against one of the producers.

Broadcast
The series airs on Nickelodeon worldwide. It premiered in Canada on August 12, 2013, on YTV and on September 7, 2013, on the original channel. The show previewed on September 1, 2013, and premiered on October 14, 2013, in the United Kingdom and Ireland. It previewed on September 30, 2013, and premiered on October 7, 2013, and October 11, 2013, in New Zealand and Australia, respectively. In Southeast Asia it started airing on October 19, 2013.

Sam & Cat: The Complete Series, containing all 35 episodes, was released on DVD exclusive to Amazon in region 1 on October 8, 2015.

Reception

Ratings
The pilot episode debuted on Nickelodeon June 8, 2013, to an audience of 4.2 million viewers. The second episode, one week later, drew 2.6 million viewers. The most watched episode is "#TheKillerTunaJump: #Freddie #Jade #Robbie", which aired January 18, 2014, to 4.8 million viewers; the second most watched episode is the pilot (4.2 million), while the least watched is "#SecretSafe" (2.0 million, on October 5, 2013). In the United Kingdom the series premiere delivered 340,000 viewers, the most for that week. The Halloween episode (#DollSitting) premiere on October 26, 2013, brought 210,000 viewers staying in the same place.

Awards and nominations

References

External links
 Sam & Cat at Nick.com
 

 
2010s American comedy television series
2010s American teen sitcoms
2010s Nickelodeon original programming
2013 American television series debuts
2014 American television series endings
American television spin-offs
English-language television shows
Television controversies in the United States
Television duos
Television series by Schneider's Bakery
Television series created by Dan Schneider
Television shows set in Los Angeles
Venice, Los Angeles